Streptoglossa tenuiflora is a species of flowering plant in the family Asteraceae. It is an upright perennial or annual herb with pink to purple flowers. It is endemic to Western Australia.

Description
The leaves and branches are slightly fragrant, and covered with soft, weak, separated thin hairs or with long, soft, straight hairs and glandular. The  pink or blue-purple "flowers" are arranged in loose corymbs  and florets in a group of about 90.

Taxonomy and naming
Streptoglossa tenuiflora was first described in 1981 by Clyde Robert Dunlop  and the description was published in  Journal of the Adelaide Botanic Garden. The specific epithet (tenuiflora) means "thin flowered".

Distribution and habitat
This streptoglossa grows on clay, edges of streams and mud flats north of Carnarvon to the Kimberley region.

References

`

Asterales of Australia
Flora of Western Australia
tenuiflora